Albury is a surname. Notable people with the surname include:

Andy Albury (born 1961), Australian murderer
Bill Albury (born 1933), English footballer
Charles Donald Albury, co-pilot of the B-29 Bockscar when it dropped the atomic bomb on Nagasaki
James Albury, baseball player
James C. Albury, astronomer and television personality
Vic Albury, baseball player